These are the films shown at the 14th New York Underground Film Festival, held from March 28 - April 3, 2007.

See also
 New York Underground Film Festival site
 2007 Festival Archive

New York Underground Film Festival
New York Underground Film Festival, 2007
Underground Film Festival
New York Underground Film
2007 in American cinema